Whittier School or John Greenleaf Whittier School may refer to:

(by state)
John G. Whittier School (Phoenix, Arizona), listed on the NRHP in Arizona
Whittier School, an elementary school in the Long Beach Unified School District, CA
Whittier State School, former reform school in Whittier, California
Whittier High School in Whittier, California
Whittier School, an elementary school in the Chicago school district
John Greenleaf Whittier School, No. 33, Indianapolis, Indiana, NRHP-listed
Whittier School (Waterloo, Iowa), NRHP-listed
John Greenleaf Whittier School (Philadelphia, Pennsylvania), Philadelphia, Pennsylvania, NRHP-listed
Whittier School (Mitchell, South Dakota), NRHP-listed
Whittier School (Logan, Utah), NRHP-listed
Whittier Education Campus, in Washington, DC

See also
Whittier Elementary School (disambiguation)
John Greenleaf Whittier
John Greenleaf Whittier House, Amesbury, MA, listed on the NRHP in Massachusetts